Red Bull is a brand of energy drinks created and owned by the Austrian company Red Bull GmbH. With a market share of 38%, it is the most popular energy drink brand as of 2019, and the third most valuable soft drink brand behind Coca-Cola and Pepsi. Since its launch in 1987, more than 100 billion cans of Red Bull have been sold worldwide, including over 11.5 billion in 2022.

Originally available only in a single nondescript flavor sold in a tall and slim silver-blue can, called Red Bull Energy Drink, numerous variants of the drink were added over the course of time. Its slogan, "Red Bull Gives You Wings", is considered one of the most popular and memorable advertising slogans in the United States, ranking at 16 out of 25 with a 59.3% slogan recognition rate according to a study by advertising and market research firm Survata. Rather than following a traditional marketing approach, Red Bull has generated awareness and created a "brand myth" through proprietary extreme sport event series such as Red Bull Cliff Diving World Series, Red Bull Air Race, Red Bull Crashed Ice and standout stunts such as the Stratos space diving project. In addition to sport series, its marketing includes multiple sports team ownerships; celebrity endorsements; and music, through its Red Bull Records label.

Red Bull traces its origins to a similar drink called Krating Daeng, which was introduced in 1976 in Thailand by the pharmacist Chaleo Yoovidhya. While doing business in Thailand, Dietrich Mateschitz purchased a can of Krating Daeng and claimed it cured his jet lag. Mateschitz sought to create a partnership with Yoovidhya and formulated a product that would suit the tastes of Westerners, such as carbonating the product. In 1984 the two founded Red Bull GmbH in Fuschl am See, Salzburg, Austria. When branding their new product Mateschitz referenced Krating Daeng's name as in Thai, daeng means red, and a krating (known in English as a gaur or Indian bison) is a large species of wild bovine native to the Indian subcontinent. In 1987, the company sold its first can of Red Bull in Austria. In 1996 Red Bull began operation in the United States and has seen steady growth ever since. Both Red Bull and Kraeting Daeng use the same red bull on yellow sun logo while continuing to market their drinks separately in the Thai and Western markets.

History

In 1976, Chaleo Yoovidhya introduced a drink called Krating Daeng in Thailand, which means "red gaur" in English. It was popular among Thai truck drivers and labourers. While working for German manufacturer Blendax (later acquired by Procter & Gamble) in 1982, Dietrich Mateschitz travelled to Thailand and met Chaleo, owner of T.C. Pharmaceutical. During his visit, Mateschitz discovered that Krating Daeng helped cure his jet lag. In 1984, Mateschitz co-founded Red Bull GmbH with Yoovidhya and turned it into an international brand. Each partner invested US$500,000 of savings to fund the company. Yoovidhya and Mateschitz each held a 49 percent share of the new company. They gave the remaining two percent to Yoovidhya's son, Chalerm, but it was agreed that Mateschitz would run the company. The product was first launched in Austria on 1 April 1987.

In Thailand, energy drinks are most popular with blue-collar workers. Red Bull re-positioned the drink as a trendy, upscale drink, first introducing it at Austrian ski resorts. Pricing was a key differentiator, with Red Bull positioned as a premium drink and Krating Daeng as a lower cost item. In many countries, both drinks are available, dominating both ends of the price spectrum. The flavouring used for Red Bull is still produced in Bangkok and exported worldwide. Gary Smith is one of the co-CEOs of Red Bull. As a senior board member and corporate secretary between 2000 and 2007, Mr. Smith was also responsible for all day-to-day operations of the company as the COO, including sales, trade marketing, motorsports marketing, finance, information systems, legal, supply chain, operations, and human resources.

During the 1990s, the product expanded into Hungary, Slovenia, Germany, the United Kingdom, and the United States. It entered Germany and the UK in 1994, the United States (via California) in 1997 and the Middle East in 2000. In 2008, Forbes magazine listed both Chaleo and Mateschitz as the 250th richest people in the world with an estimated net worth of US$4 billion.

Mateschitz died on 22 October 2022 aged 78, following a long illness.

Red Bull GmbH is headquartered in Fuschl am See, an Austrian village of about 1,500 inhabitants near Salzburg. The company is 51 percent controlled by the Yoovidhya family who, for technical reasons, owns the trademark in Europe and the US.

Ingredients

Depending on the country, Red Bull contains different amounts of caffeine, taurine, B vitamins (B2, B3, B5, B6, B12) and simple sugars (sucrose and glucose) in a buffer solution of carbonated water, baking soda and magnesium carbonate (substituted in some flavours with a trisodium citrate/citric acid buffer, each solution providing electrolytes). To produce Red Bull Sugarfree, sugars sucrose and glucose have been replaced by artificial sweeteners, acesulfame K and aspartame or sucralose.

Previous formulations of Red Bull contained 0.24% glucuronolactone (600 mg of glucuronolactone in a 250 ml can), but this ingredient was removed.

Health effects

Claims about the drink's effects and performance have been challenged on various occasions, with the UK's Advertising Standards Authority imposing advertising restrictions in 2001 in response to complaints recorded as early as 1997.

Energy drinks have the effects that caffeine and sugar provide, but experts still argue about the possible effects of the other ingredients. Most of the effects of energy drinks on cognitive performance, such as increased attention and reaction speed, are primarily due to the presence of caffeine. There is evidence that energy drinks can increase mental and athletic performance. A study funded by Red Bull GmbH, which did not include a caffeine-only control group, found that performance during prolonged driving is increased after consumption of Red Bull. Other tests for physical performance showed results such as increased endurance and power. Red Bull energy drink increased upper body muscle endurance during repeated Wingate tests in young healthy adults. Excessive or repeated consumption of energy drinks can lead to cardiac and psychiatric conditions.

The European Food Safety Authority (EFSA) concluded that exposure to taurine and glucuronolactone at the levels presently used in energy drinks is not a safety concern. In a separate analysis, they also concluded that there is insufficient evidence to support a number of commercial health claims about taurine. A review published in 2008 found no documented reports of negative or positive health effects associated with the amount of taurine used in energy drinks, including Red Bull.

Caffeine content
The caffeine content of a single 250ml can of Red Bull is approximately 40–80 mg250 ml (15–32 mg100 ml). The caffeine level in Red Bull varies depending on country, as some countries have legal restrictions on how much caffeine is allowed in drinks. As is the case with other caffeinated beverages, Red Bull drinkers may experience adverse effects as a result of overuse. Excessive consumption may induce mild to moderate euphoria primarily caused by stimulant properties of caffeine and may also induce agitation, anxiety, irritability and insomnia.

The general population of healthy adults is not at risk for potential adverse effects from caffeine if they limit their consumption to 400 mg per day, which is the equivalent of 5 standard cans, with one can being 250 ml in volume. Consumption of a single energy drink will not lead to excessive caffeine intake. Adverse effects associated with caffeine consumption in amounts greater than 400 mg include nervousness, irritability, sleeplessness, increased urination, abnormal heart rhythms (arrhythmia), and dyspepsia. Consumption also has been known to cause pupil dilation when taken with certain antidepressants or SSRIs. Caffeine dosage is not required to be on the product label for food in the United States, unlike drugs, but some advocates are urging the Food and Drug Administration (FDA) to change this practice. (Red Bull voluntarily lists the caffeine content in each can along with the ingredient list.)

Variants 
Over the years, Red Bull has offered many variations of its drink, all based on the same formula but differing in taste and colour. 

Red Bull began offering variations on its drinks in 2003 with a sugar-free version of the drink with a distinct flavor from the original, called Red Bull Sugarfree. In 2012, Red Bull released Red Bull Total Zero, a variant without calories. In 2018, the company released Red Bull Zero, a different sugar-free formulation designed to taste more like the original flavor.

In 2009, Red Bull unveiled a highly concentrated variant of its drink called Red Bull Energy Shot. It comes in 2 oz (60 ml) cans.

The company began expanding its flavor offerings in 2013 with the launch of Red Bull Editions. Initially available in cranberry, lime, and blueberry, the Editions line has grown to include a variety of flavours, including some available only during specific seasons or in certain regions.

Other products 
Red Bull released a cola, called Simply Cola, in 2008. A new version of the cola was released in 2019, as part of Red Bull's Organics line.

In 2018, the company launched Organics by Red Bull, a line of organic sodas with four flavours; bitter lemon, ginger ale, tonic water, and a new version of Red Bull Simply Cola.

Market approval and legal status
Authorities in France, Denmark, and Norway initially kept Red Bull from being sold domestically. However, it is on sale in all 27 member states of the European Union and in 171 countries around the world.

The French food safety agency was concerned about taurine. A Red Bull drink that did not contain taurine was introduced. The French refusal of market approval was challenged by the European Commission, and partially upheld by the European Court of Justice in 2004. The French food safety agency relented in 2008, because it was unable to prove a definite health risk, taurine-related or not.

Litigation
In 2013, Red Bull told the Redwell Brewery, a Norfolk micro brewery, to change its name or face legal action, because it sounded too similar to Red Bull. The eight-man brewery in Norwich was told its name could "confuse" customers and "tarnish" its trademark. The two companies reached a settlement permitting Redwell to continue using its name.

In 2014, Red Bull entered into a US$13 million settlement to resolve two consumer class action lawsuits in the United States District Court for the Southern District of New York. Named as plaintiffs were Benjamin Careathers, David Wolf, and Miguel Almarez who had sued the company claiming breach of express warranty and unjust enrichment, alleging that Red Bull falsely asserted performance-enhancing benefits from the drink's ingredients that were unsubstantiated by scientific studies. On 1 May 2015 the Court approved the settlement, giving customers who had submitted claims the opportunity to receive a US$10 cash reimbursement or US$15 in Red Bull products within 150 days of affirmance on any appeal. Contrary to reports from some news outlets, the plaintiffs had not alleged that the drink did not give consumers actual wings.

Advertising, sports team ownership, and sponsorships

Since 1997, Red Bull has been making commercials bearing its slogan "Red Bull gives you wings." Commercials usually were crudely animated and featured characters with constant squints.

Red Bull's international marketing campaign is largely linked to extreme sports. These range from motorcycle racing, such as MotoGP, Dakar Rally, motorcycle speedway, mountain biking, aerobatics, BMX, motocross, windsurfing, snowboarding, skateboarding, kayaking, rowing, wakeboarding, cliff-diving, parkour, surfing, skating, freestyle motocross, rallycross, Formula 1 racing, NASCAR racing, to breakdancing. Red Bull uses music and video games, and has enlisted celebrities, such as Eminem (sponsoring the Red Bull "EmSee Battle Rap championships"). It hosts events like art shows and the "Red Bull Flugtag" (German for "flight day" or "flying day").

Red Bull owns football teams, with clubs in Austria, Germany, the United States, and Brazil featuring the Red Bull trademark in their names. By associating the drink's image with these activities, the company seeks to promote a "cool" public image and raise brand power. The energy drink has created a market for over 150 related types of products.

In the PlayStation 3's social gaming platform, PlayStation Home, Red Bull developed its own in-game island, specifically advertising its energy drink and the Red Bull Air Race event (for which the space is named) released in January 2009. In late November 2009, Red Bull produced two new spaces, the Red Bull Illume space, and the Red Bull Beach space featuring the Red Bull Flugtag, both released on the same day. In January 2012, Red Bull released its first personal space called the "Red Bull House of Skate" featuring an indoor skate park.

In 2010, the company enlisted Adrian Newey to design a prototype racing car, the Red Bull X2010, for the video game Gran Turismo 5.

In 2022, Red Bull announced a full-on production of a hypercar called RB17, also designed by Newey.

Red Bull Arts
Red Bull Arts is an art fellowship program launched by Red Bull in 2013 under the name Red Bull House of Arts. The program has multiple locations, including Detroit, Michigan; São Paulo, Brazil; and formerly New York City. The program typically consists of a three-month period during which six to eight participants will create new artwork to be displayed at a final exhibition. During the fellowship, artists receive unlimited access to the galleries and a stipend for art supplies. Some of the artwork has been used in Red Bull advertising campaigns.

Sports and esports sponsorships
Red Bull has used sports sponsorships as an advertising vehicle for most of its existence. The company first started sponsoring athletes in 1989, initially focusing on Formula One racing and extreme sports such as windsurfing and hang gliding, and later growing to include more mainstream sports such as basketball and soccer. As of 2016, the company sponsored more than 750 individual athletes and more than a dozen teams in various disciplines, including motorsports, soccer, and esports.

Athlete sponsorships
Austrian Formula One driver Gerhard Berger was the first athlete to be sponsored by Red Bull in 1989. Many of the company's early sponsorships were in lesser-known or extreme sports, including Olympic rower Xeno Müller, who won a gold medal at the 1996 Atlanta Olympics in the single scull race and BASE jumpers Frank "Gambler" Gambalie, Miles Dashier, and Shane McConkey. In the 2010s, Red Bull began expanding its athlete base to include athletes from more mainstream sports, including Austrian tennis player Dominic Thiem, Brazilian skateboarder Letícia Bufoni, American skier Lindsey Vonn, and American Major League Baseball player Kris Bryant. The company also started sponsoring video game players and esports athletes, including American Fortnite player Richard "Ninja" Blevins, Spanish League of Legends player Enrique Cedeño "xPeke" Martinez, and Swedish Super Smash Bros. player William "Leffen" Hjelte.

Team ownership and sponsorships

The first team sponsored by Red Bull was ice hockey's EC Salzburg during the 1987–88 season. Red Bull acquired the club outright in 2000. Since 2014, Salzburg has also hosted the company's joint ice hockey and soccer academy. Red Bull became the title sponsor of DEL team EHC München in 2012, and took full ownership the following year. It also financed the team's new arena, SAP Garden.

In 1995, Red Bull sponsored its first motorsports team, the Swiss Formula One team Sauber and in 1999 started sponsoring the Flying Bulls, a Czech aerobatics team.

In the 2000s, the company expanded its sporting team ownership to include several soccer teams, including the Austrian Bundesliga team SV Austria Salzburg (rebranded as Red Bull Salzburg), the Major League Soccer team the New York MetroStars (rebranded as the New York Red Bulls) in 2006, and the fifth-tier German team SSV Markranstadt (rebranded as RasenBallsport Leipzig) in 2009, which the company sought to move to the top of the German Bundesliga. RB Leipzig has been divisive and the subject of protests by some fans but has also experienced rapid success, climbing through the German soccer divisions to get a place in the top-flight German Bundesliga and earning berths in the UEFA Champions League in 2017–2018 and 2019–2020, the latter trip ending with a semi-final loss to Paris St. Germain. The company also sponsors the Los Angeles Clippers NBA team and Red Bull 3X, a series of men's and women's 3x3 basketball tournaments.

In the 2010s, Red Bull began sponsoring gamers and esports organizations, including OG, G2 Esports and Cloud9, and founded the Red Bulls League of Legends team.

In 2021, Red Bull sponsored Hoang Anh Gia Lai from V.League 1.
  Red Bull Salzburg
  FC Liefering
  Red Bull Bragantino
  Red Bull Brasil
  RB Leipzig
  RB Leipzig II
  Red Bull New York
  Red Bull New York II

Events

Current and former Red Bull events include ACF Nationals (2009), Air Race World Championship (2003–2019), Argentine motorcycle Grand Prix, Art of Motion, BC One, Big Wave Africa, Cape Fear, Cliff Diving World Series, Crashed Ice, Dolomitenmann, Drifting World Championship, Flugtag, Frozen Rush, Indianapolis motorcycle Grand Prix, King of the Air, King of the Rock Tournament, Last Man Standing, MotoGP Rookies Cup, Motorcycle Grand Prix of the Americas, New Year No Limits, Paper Wings, Rampage, Red Bull 400, Red Bull Joyride, Road Rage, Romaniacs Hard Enduro Rallye, Soapbox Race, Spanish motorcycle Grand Prix, Stratos, Street Freestyle World Champions (2019), Trolley Grand Prix, Unleashed (2015), Wings for Life World Run, X-Alps, Xcbusa, and X-Fighters.

See also

 Red Bull Stratos – stratospheric parachute jump 2012

References

External links 

 

 
Austrian brands
Products introduced in 1987
Energy drinks
Austrian cuisine
Soft drinks
Drink brands